SigmaStat is a statistical software package, which was originally developed by Jandel Scientific Software in the 1980s. As of October 1996, Systat Software is now based in San Jose, California. SigmaStat can compare effects among groups, conduct survival analysis, analyze rates and proportions, perform regression and correlation analysis and calculate power and sample size. The program uses a wizard based interface which asks the user questions about the project and its data. After a test is run, the user receives a detailed report that interprets the results.

If installed with SigmaPlot, SigmaStat integrated with SigmaPlot and SigmaPlot gained advanced statistical analysis capabilities from version 11. SigmaStat is available both as a separate product or is available integrated with SigmaPlot.

On February 1, 2016 SigmaStat version 4 was relaunched as a separate Advisory Statistics Software by Systat Software Inc.

Version history 

 Version 1.0 : 1994
 Version 2.0 : 1997
 Version 3.0 : 2003
 Version 3.1 : 2005
 Version 3.5 : 2007 (integrated with SigmaPlot 10)
 Version 4.0 : 2008 (integrated with SigmaPlot 11)
 Version 4.00 : Relaunched as SigmaStat version 4.00 on February 1, 2016.

External links 

 Systat Webpage
 SigmaPlot Webpage
 Systat Software Webpage

Statistical software
Windows-only software